In Greek mythology, Tiphys (Ancient Greek: Τῖφυς Tîphus) was the helmsman of the Argonauts.

Family 
Tiphys was the Thespian son of Hagnias or of Phorbas of Elis and Hyrmine, daughter of Epeius. In the latter account, he was possibly the brother of Augeas and Actor.

Mythology

Pilot of Argo 
Among his crew members, Tiphys was chosen to steer the long ship Argo.

Apollonius' account 

 Tiphys, son of Hagnias, left the Siphaean people of the Thespians, well skilled to foretell the rising wave on the broad sea, and well skilled to infer from sun and star the stormy winds and the time for sailing. Tritonian Athena herself urged him to join the band of chiefs, and he came among them a welcome comrade.

Valerius' account

Statius' account 

 Tiphys himself wearies by his labours the heavy billows and the tiller that will not hear him, and pale with anxiety oft changes his commands, and turns right- and leftward from the land the prow that would fain dash itself to shipwreck on the rocks, until from the vessel's tapering bows the son of Aeson holds forth the olive-branch of Pallas hat Mopsus bore, and through the tumult of his comrades would prevent him, asks for peace; his words were swept away by the headlong gale.

Orphic Argonautica

 He (Tiphys) left the Thespians to work on the waters of Teumessia near the mountain of poplars. He knew the painstaking art of discerning from the bellowing and flashing of storms when and how to guide the ship.

Death 
During the voyage to Colchis, Tiphys died of a mysterious illness in the land of the Mariandynians or, according to some sources, a snakebite. After his death, Ancaeus piloted the Argo.

Notes

References 

 Apollonius Rhodius, Argonautica translated by Robert Cooper Seaton (1853-1915), R. C. Loeb Classical Library Volume 001. London, William Heinemann Ltd, 1912. Online version at the Topos Text Project.
 Apollonius Rhodius, Argonautica. George W. Mooney. London. Longmans, Green. 1912. Greek text available at the Perseus Digital Library.
 Gaius Julius Hyginus, Fabulae from The Myths of Hyginus translated and edited by Mary Grant. University of Kansas Publications in Humanistic Studies. Online version at the Topos Text Project.
 Gaius Valerius Flaccus, Argonautica translated by Mozley, J H. Loeb Classical Library Volume 286. Cambridge, MA, Harvard University Press; London, William Heinemann Ltd. 1928. Online version at theio.com.
 Gaius Valerius Flaccus, Argonauticon. Otto Kramer. Leipzig. Teubner. 1913. Latin text available at the Perseus Digital Library.
 Pausanias, Description of Greece with an English Translation by W.H.S. Jones, Litt.D., and H.A. Ormerod, M.A., in 4 Volumes. Cambridge, MA, Harvard University Press; London, William Heinemann Ltd. 1918. . Online version at the Perseus Digital Library
Pausanias, Graeciae Descriptio. 3 vols. Leipzig, Teubner. 1903.  Greek text available at the Perseus Digital Library.
 Pseudo-Apollodorus, The Library with an English Translation by Sir James George Frazer, F.B.A., F.R.S. in 2 Volumes, Cambridge, MA, Harvard University Press; London, William Heinemann Ltd. 1921. . Online version at the Perseus Digital Library. Greek text available from the same website.
 Publius Papinius Statius, The Thebaid translated by John Henry Mozley. Loeb Classical Library Volumes. Cambridge, MA, Harvard University Press; London, William Heinemann Ltd. 1928. Online version at the Topos Text Project.
 Publius Papinius Statius, The Thebaid. Vol I-II. John Henry Mozley. London: William Heinemann; New York: G.P. Putnam's Sons. 1928. Latin text available at the Perseus Digital Library.
 The Orphic Argonautica, translated by Jason Colavito. © Copyright 2011. Online version at the Topos Text Project.

Family of Calyce

Argonauts
Characters in the Argonautica
Boeotian characters in Greek mythology
Elean characters in Greek mythology